Tunku Abdul Jalil Iskandar ibni Sultan Ibrahim Ismail (5 July 1990 – 5 December 2015) was the Tunku Laksamana of Johor. He was born to members of the Johor Royal Family (his paternal side of the family) and the Perak Royal Family (his maternal side of the family).

Tunku Abdul Jalil was the fourth child of the current Sultan of Johor, Sultan Ibrahim Ismail and his consort Raja Zarith Sofiah. He was the fourth grandson of the previous Sultan of Johor, Sultan Iskandar and the previous Sultan of Perak, Sultan Idris Shah II.

Life and education
Tunku Abdul Jalil was born on 5 July 1990 at Istana Besar, Johor Bahru. He received his early education at Sekolah Sri Utama Johor Bahru and then later at the Yayasan Pelajaran Johor (YPJ) Zaikarim Johor Baru International School. He was a degree holder in Zoological and Conservation Studies from the Zoological Society of London in the United Kingdom.

Upon his return from London, he became a volunteer at the Sepilok Orang Utan Rehabilitation Centre in Sandakan, Sabah. He was also a volunteer at the Singapore Zoological Garden's Reptile and Veterinary Department for a year and London Zoo for almost two years.

Tunku Abdul Jalil was also active in various charity organisations including the Johor Spastic Association, the Malaysian Nature Society, the Orangutan Appeal UK foundation and the Malaysian Red Crescent Society. For sports, he did not play Polo as other royalty. This is due to his allergy to horsehair, however, he shows interest in Sailing. In 2013, he introduced the Malaysian Sailing League and a youth sailing programme to Malaysia. He received President Development Award from the International Sailing Federation (ISAF; now known as World Sailing) in 2014.

Police career 
In 2011, Tunku Abdul Jalil entered 9-months Royal Malaysia Police (RMP) Probationary Inspector Course Intake 1/2011 at Malaysian Police Training Centre (PULAPOL), Semarak Road and commissioned as Probationary Inspector on 8 January 2012. He then follows his father's footsteps as a special forces-trained by entering the Basic Special Actions Course in 2013 and then became a part of the RMP's elite counter-terrorist unit, the Special Actions Unit. In 2015, he was promoted to the rank of Inspector. He was the first and only royalty to serve in the RMP.

Illness and death
Tunku Abdul Jalil was confirmed to have stage four liver cancer in December 2014 and had sought treatment at a hospital in Guangzhou, China.

Tunku Abdul Jalil died on 5 December 2015 in Royal Ward, Sultanah Aminah Hospital, Johor Bahru at the age of 25 due to cancer. On 6 December 2015, he was accorded a royal state funeral in Istana Besar, Johor Bahru and was buried next to the grave of his late grandfather, Almarhum Sultan Iskandar ibni Almarhum Sultan Ismail at the Mahmoodiah Royal Mausoleum, Johor Bahru.

Honours

  First Class of the Royal Family Order of Johor (DK I) (22 November 2012)
  Knight Commander of the Order of the Crown of Johor (DPMJ) – Dato' (11 April 2009)  
  Grand Knight of the Order of Sultan Ibrahim of Johor (SMIJ) – Dato' (2015)
  General Service Medal (7 Jan 2012)
  Sultan Ibrahim Coronation Medal (PSI 1st class, 23 March 2015).

Legacy
The Tunku Laksamana Abdul Jalil Mosque at the Royal Malaysia Police's Johor Contingent Headquarters was named after him.
The Tunku Laksamana Johor Cancer Foundation.
 The Dewan Tunku Laksamana Abdul Jalil at Politeknik Ibrahim Sultan, Pasir Gudang, Johor was named after him.
Tunku Abdul Jalil Conservation Center, Tengah Island was launched in 2018 by Sultan Ibrahim.

Ancestry

References

Malaysian police officers
1990 births
2015 deaths
House of Temenggong of Johor
Royal House of Perak
Malaysian people of Malay descent
Malaysian Muslims
People from Johor Bahru
Malaysian people of English descent
Malaysian people of Danish descent
Malaysian people of Chinese descent
Sons of monarchs

First Classes of the Royal Family Order of Johor
Knights Commander of the Order of the Crown of Johor